The abbreviation SOEC may refer to:

Solid oxide electrolyser cell, a solid oxide fuel cell in regenerative mode.
South Okanagan Events Centre, an indoor arena in Penticton, British Columbia.